The Selangor State Legislative Assembly is the unicameral state legislature of the Malaysian state of Selangor. The State Assembly is composed of 56 members representing single-member constituencies throughout the state. Elections are held no more than five years apart, and by Malaysian political convention, are conducted simultaneously with elections to the federal parliament and other state assemblies (except Sabah and Sarawak).

It convenes at the Sultan Salahuddin Abdul Aziz Shah Building in the capital Shah Alam. Since 2008, Assembly proceedings have been broadcast live on the internet.

Current composition

Seating arrangement

Role
As the state's legislative body, the Selangor State Legislative Assembly's main function is to enact laws that apply to Selangor, known as enactments. The Speaker presides over the Assembly's proceedings, and works to maintain order during debates. The present Speaker is Ng Suee Lim from the Democratic Action Party in the Pakatan Harapan coalition.

The state government's executive branch (known as the Selangor State Executive Council (EXCO), or Majlis Mesyuarat Kerajaan Negeri), including the Menteri Besar, are drawn from the Assembly. The Menteri Besar is ceremonially appointed by the Sultan of Selangor on the basis that he is able to command a majority in the Assembly. The Menteri Besar then appoints members of the State EXCO drawing from members of the Assembly.

Selcat
The Speaker also chairs the Select Committee on Competency, Accountability and Transparency (Selcat), a six-member panel consisting of state assemblymen which holds public hearings to investigate state issues. Selcat was formed when Pakatan Rakyat came to power after the 2008 election.

Speakers Roll of Honour

The following is the Speaker of the Selangor State Legislative Assembly Roll of Honour, since 1959:

Election pendulum 

The 14th General Election witnessed 51 governmental seats and 5 non-governmental seats filled the Selangor State Legislative Assembly. The government side has 21 safe seats and 8 fairly safe seats. However, none of the non-government side has safe and fairly safe seat.

List of Assemblies

References

External links

Dewan Negeri Selangor official website
TV Selangor - Dewan Negeri Selangor
Selangor State Legislative Assembly official website
Selangor Government Multimedia Portal - View recordings of proceedings

 
S
Government of Selangor
Politics of Selangor
Unicameral legislatures